The Order of the Two Rivers ( Wisam Al Rafidain) was an Order awarded by the Kings of Iraq and then the Presidents of Iraq.

History 
It was named after the two rivers the Euphrates and the Tigris that flow through the middle of the country. It was initially awarded by the kings of Iraq between 1922 when the monarchy was established, and 1958 when the monarchy ended. It was continued by the presidents of Iraq through the 1960s, 1970s and 1980s.

Classes 
It had five classes and two divisions (military and civil).

Recipients

 Ali of Hejaz
 George VI
 Gustaf VI Adolf
 Francis Humphrys
 Hussein of Jordan
 Henryk Jabłoński
 Salman bin Hamad Al Khalifa I
 David Luce
 Josip Broz Tito
 Hugh Trenchard, 1st Viscount Trenchard
 Arthur Young

See also 
 Order of the Nile

References

External links 

Iraqi monarchy
Orders, decorations, and medals of Iraq
Two Rivers, Order of the
Awards established in 1922
1922 establishments in Iraq